The 2018–19 Howard Bison men's basketball team represented Howard University during the 2018–19 NCAA Division I men's basketball season. The Bison, led by ninth-year head coach Kevin Nickelberry, played their home games at Burr Gymnasium in Washington, D.C. as members of the Mid-Eastern Athletic Conference. They finished the season 17-17, 10-6 in MEAC Play to finish a tie for 3rd place. They defeated Bethune-Cookman in the quarterfinals of the MEAC tournament before losing in the semifinals to Norfolk State. They received an at-large bid to the College Basketball Invitational where they lost in the first round to Coastal Carolina.

Departures 
 Kai tease
 Ibrahim Dosunmu
 Michael Obindu
 Henry Odunze

Transfers 
 Phillip Jones

Roster

Schedule 

|-
!colspan=12 style=| Non-conference regular season

|-
!colspan=12 style=| MEAC regular season
|-

|-
!colspan=12 style=| MEAC tournament
|-

|-
!colspan=12 style=| College Basketball Invitational
|-

References

Howard Bison men's basketball seasons
Howard Bison
Howard
Howard
Howard